Luis González (born 9 March 1949) is a Chilean former boxer. He competed in the men's welterweight event at the 1968 Summer Olympics.

References

External links
 

1949 births
Living people
Chilean male boxers
Olympic boxers of Chile
Boxers at the 1968 Summer Olympics
People from Concepción Province, Chile
Welterweight boxers
20th-century Chilean people
21st-century Chilean people